The 2018 Liga 3 was the second season of the Liga 3 under its current name, the third season under its current league structure, and the only amateur league football competition in Indonesia. 

The league was divided into the regional stage and the national stage. Every amateur team in Indonesia competed in its provincial stage of the league and the teams which relegated from 2017 Liga 2 competed in the national zone preliminary round.

Persik defeated PSCS 3–2 on aggregate to win their first Liga 3 title.

Overview

Player regulations
Teams can register a maximum of 30 players. 27 players were under 23 years old (U-23) and 3 players without age restriction, the teams also could not use foreign players.

Qualifying round
Qualifying round for national round was divided into 2 routes:
 Regional route (consist of representatives from 34 provinces). First, each province held their provincial league followed by unlimited amateur teams with different competition format (see table below). Then qualified teams from provincial league competed in their respective region to earn 24 spots in regional preliminary round based on their quota. These 24 teams then competed for 12 slots in national round.
 National zone route was consisted of the teams which relegated from 2017 Liga 2, 20 teams (winners and runner-ups from 8 groups + 4 play-off winner) qualified for national round from this route.

Regional route

Province round
These teams were representatives from their provincial league to be competed in regional round.

Regional round

National zone route

National round
A total of 32 teams (20 teams from national zone route and 12 teams from The regional route) compete in this round.

First round
In this first round, 32 teams divided into eight groups. Each group played a home tournament basis. First round was played from 26 November – 2 December 2018. Winner and runner-up of each group advanced to second round.

Group A
PSGC hosted this group at Galuh Stadium, Ciamis Regency and Wiradadaha Stadium, Tasikmalaya.

Group B
PSCS hosted this group at Wijayakusuma Stadium, Cilacap Regency and Goentoer Darjono Stadium, Purbalingga Regency.

Group C
Bogor hosted this group at Mini Stadium and Pakansari Stadium, Cibinong. But due to 212 reunion activity and the arrival of the president to Pakansari Stadium (Indonesian Teacher's Union Anniversary), the last matches in this group was moved to Heri Sudrajat Stadium, Depok and PPMP Stadium, Sentul without spectators.

Group D
PS Badung hosted this group at Gelora Samudera Stadium, Kuta and Beji Mandala Stadium, Pecatu.

Group E
Persijap hosted this group at Gelora Bumi Kartini Stadium. Perseka withdrew from the competition due to technical constraints.

Group F
PSBK hosted this group at Gelora Supriyadi Stadium, Blitar.

Group G
Persik hosted this group at Brawijaya Stadium, Kediri and Canda Bhirawa Stadium, Kediri Regency.

Group H
Persinga hosted this group at Brantas Stadium and Kusuma Agrowisata Stadium, Batu.

Second round
The second round featured by 16 teams which are the winners and runner-ups from each group of the first round. The second round matches was played from 8–9 December 2018. Each winner advanced to third round.

Third round
In this round, eight teams divided into two groups. Each group played a home tournament basis. Third round was played from 16–22 December 2018. Three best teams of each group promoted to Liga 2. Winner of each group also advanced to final.

West Group
PSGC hosted this group at Galuh Stadium, Ciamis Regency.

East Group
Persik hosted this group at Brawijaya Stadium, Kediri and Canda Bhirawa Stadium, Kediri Regency.

Finals

Persik won 3–2 on aggregate

Champions

See also
 2018 Liga 1
 2018 Liga 2
 2018–19 Piala Indonesia

References

Liga 3
Liga 3
Liga 3